Beatrixkwartier is a RandstadRail station in the Beatrixkwartier district in The Hague, Netherlands.

History

The station opened on 29 October 2006 for RandstadRail line 4, and on 20 October 2007 for RandstadRail line 3.

RandstadRail services

The following services currently call at Beatrixkwartier:

Gallery

RandstadRail stations in The Hague

References